Mante may refer to:

Mante, formally Ciudad Mante, a city in the Mexican state of Tamaulipas
Harald Mante (born 1936), German photographer
Thomas Mante (c. 1733 – c. 1802), English army officer, historian, military writer and French spy
La Mante, 2017 French TV series